Robert Lee Johnson may refer to:

 Bob Johnson (outfielder) (Robert Lee Johnson, 1905–1982), American left fielder in Major League Baseball
 Robert Lee Johnson (spy) (1922–1972), American sergeant who spied for the Soviet Union